Thai Town is a neighbourhood in Sydney with a high concentration of Thai retail outlets. It is located in Haymarket on Campbell Street, to the east of George Street, close to Central railway station. , Sydney had the highest population of Thais in Australia, with a growing population of around 100,000.

Thai Town contains many Thai restaurants, video stores, grocery stores, salons and other businesses.

Thai Town was established in 2000 when rent was relatively affordable, and because it provided a source for Thai speciality foods, many Thai businesses moved into the area. Many Thai festivals, such as the Songkran Festival (Thai New Year) held every April, are celebrated in Thai Town. 

Chinatown, created in 1980, and Koreatown are adjacent to Thai Town.

References
 

Asian-Australian culture in Sydney
Thai-Australian culture
Ethnic enclaves in Australia
Thai Towns
Haymarket, New South Wales